Quentin Régis Beunardeau (born 27 February 1994) is a French footballer who plays as a goalkeeper for Portuguese club Leixões.

Club career

Le Mans 
During the 2012–13 off-season, Beunardeau signed his first professional contract agreeing to a four-year deal. He was, subsequently, promoted to the senior team for the 2012–13 season by manager Denis Zanko. He made his professional debut in the team's opening league match of the 2012–13 campaign; a 2–2 draw against Lens.

Nancy 
In January 2014, following Le Mans's fall to the lower divisions of French football, Beunardeau signed a three-and-a-half year contract with AS Nancy. He was given the number 1 jersey, and considered third goalkeeper behind Paul Nardi and Damien Grégorini.

International career 
Beunardeau is a France youth international having represented his nation at all levels for which he has been eligible. He played with the under-17 team at the 2011 UEFA European Under-17 Football Championship and 2011 FIFA U-17 World Cup.

References

External links 

 
 
 
 
FFF Profile

1994 births
Living people
Footballers from Le Mans
French footballers
French expatriate footballers
France youth international footballers
Association football goalkeepers
Ligue 1 players
Ligue 2 players
Challenger Pro League players
Primeira Liga players
Le Mans FC players
AS Nancy Lorraine players
A.F.C. Tubize players
FC Metz players
C.D. Aves players
Gil Vicente F.C. players
Leixões S.C. players
French expatriate sportspeople in Belgium
French expatriate sportspeople in Portugal
Expatriate footballers in Belgium
Expatriate footballers in Portugal